Anastasia: Music from the Motion Picture is the soundtrack for the 1997 Fox Animation Studios film Anastasia. It contains songs from the film written by Lynn Ahrens and Stephen Flaherty, selections of the original score composed by David Newman, and performed by Liz Callaway, Jim Cummings, Jonathan Dokuchitz and Kelsey Grammer, among others, and features singles by Aaliyah and Deana Carter, and a duet with Richard Marx and Donna Lewis, along with tracks from the film's score composed by Newman. It was released on October 28, 1997, on CD and audio cassette.

The songs "Journey to the Past" and "Once Upon a December" were given nominations from the Academy Awards and Golden Globes. Newman also received his first Oscar nomination for the score. The single "At the Beginning" managed to position number forty-five on the Billboard Hot 100, and also to number two on the Billboard Adult Contemporary chart.

Track listing 
All songs are composed by Stephen Flaherty with lyrics by Lynn Ahrens. All scores are composed by David Newman.

Personnel 

 Aaliyah – Performer, Finger Snaps
 Lynn Ahrens – Producer
 Brooks Almy – Vocals, Ensemble
 Eric Altenburger – Design
 Alexander Areteds – Mixing Assistant
 Patricia P. Azar – Translation
 Randall Barlow – Programming
 Tom Bender – Assistant Engineer
 Ellen Bernfeld – Vocals, Ensemble
 Douglas Besterman – Orchestration
 Judy Blazer – Vocals, Ensemble
 Jeff Blumenkrantz – Vocals, Ensemble
 Edwin Bonilla – Percussion
 Ted Brunetti – Vocals, Ensemble
 Glen Burtnik – Vocals, Ensemble
 Liz Callaway – Performer
 Deana Carter – Performer
 Sue Ann Carwell – Vocals (background)
 Sean Chambers – Engineer
 Vivian Cherry – Vocals, Ensemble
 Robin Clark – Vocals, Ensemble
 Victoria Clark – Vocals, Ensemble
 Jim Cummings – Performer
 Tony Dawsey – Mastering
 Darius de Haas – Vocals, Ensemble
 Madeleine Doherty – Vocals, Ensemble
 Jonathan Dokuchitz – Performer
 Anne Dudley – Piano
 Robert DuSold – Vocals, Ensemble
 Gregg Edelman – Vocals, Ensemble
 Emilio Estefan Jr. – Producer
 Alfred Figueroa – Assistant Engineer
 Steve Fitzmaurice – Engineer
 Stephen Flaherty – Producer, Vocal Arrangement

 Marty Frasu – Synthesizer
 Al Fritsch – Vocals, Ensemble
 Juan Carlos García – Translation
 Javier Garza – Engineer, Mixing
 Jim Gilstrap – Vocals (background)
 Kyle Gordon – Vocals, Ensemble
 Kelsey Grammer – Performer
 Mick Guzauski – Mixing
 Nikki Harris – Vocals (background)
 Reggie Hamilton – Bass
 Daniel Hamuy – Orchestration
 Mike Harvey – Vocals, Ensemble
 Darren Higman – Executive Producer
 Trevor Horn – Producer
 Jan Horvath – Vocals, Ensemble
 Henry Jackman – Keyboards, Programming, String Arrangements
 Randy Jackson – Bass
 John Jellison – Vocals, Ensemble
 Xandy Jenko – Orchestration
 Marlena Jeter – Vocals (background)
 Jeanette Jurado – Shaker
 Craig Kallman – Executive Producer
 Kenny Karen – Vocals, Ensemble
 Curtis Rance King Jr. – Vocals, Ensemble
 Selina King-Murrell – Vocals (background)
 Michael Knobloch – Production Coordination
 Joseph Kolinski – Vocals, Ensemble
 Alix Korey – Vocals, Ensemble
 John Kurlander – Engineer, Mixing
 Angela Lansbury – Performer
 Donna Lewis – Performer
 David Lowenstein – Vocals, Ensemble
 Mario Lucy – Engineer

 Steve MacMillan – Mixing
 Richard Marx – Arranger
 Richard Marx – Performer
 Cindy Mizelle – Vocals, Ensemble
 David Newman – Conductor, Producer, Orchestration, Score Selections
 Bill Nolte – Vocals, Ensemble
 Michael Omartian – Producer
 Michele Pawk – Vocals, Ensemble
 Michael Perfitt – Mixing Assistant
 Bernadette Peters – Performer
 Darryl Phinnessee – Vocals (background)
 Tim Pierce – Guitar
 Freddy Piñero Jr. – Engineer
 Billy Porter – Vocals, Ensemble
 Patrick Quinn – Vocals, Ensemble
 Guy Roche – Arranger, Programming, Producer
 Karen Silver – Vocals, Ensemble
 J. K. Simmons – Vocals, Ensemble
 Frank Simms – Vocals, Ensemble
 Emily Skinner – Vocals, Ensemble
 Ted Sperling – Vocals, Ensemble
 Moana Suchard – Engineer
 Thalía – Performer
 Vaneese Thomas – Vocals, Ensemble
 Michael Thompson – Guitar (Electric)
 Rene Toledo – Guitar (Acoustic)
 Dan Wallin – Engineer
 Tim Weidner – Keyboards, Programming, Engineer
 Lillias White – Vocals, Ensemble
 Aaron Zigman – String Arrangement

Charts

Weekly charts

Year-end charts

Certifications and sales

References 

1997 soundtrack albums
Anastasia (franchise)
Atlantic Records soundtracks
Cultural depictions of Grand Duchess Anastasia Nikolaevna of Russia
Musical film soundtracks
Drama film soundtracks